Sikkim Himalayan Sporting Club (sometimes known as Gangtok Himalayan SC) is an Indian professional football club based in Gangtok, Sikkim. The club usually participated in the I-League 2nd Division, then second tier of Indian football league system, and the Sikkim Premier Division League. They are also a frequent participant of the Sikkim Gold Cup, a premier club tournament in the state.

History

Formation and journey
The originally named Sikkim Himalayan SC was founded in 2012 in Gangtok, the capital city of the Indian state Sikkim, and affiliated with Sikkim Football Association (SFA). Since then, they have been participating in various domestic and amateur tournaments regionally. The club was founded by Tenzing Lamtha.

In October 2014, Gangtok Himalayan participated in Sikkim Governor's Gold Cup and reached to the semi-finals, but their journey ended with a 2–1 defeat to ONGC FC. In September 2015, former India international Arjunan Shanta Kumar was appointed manager of the club.

In January 2016, they were officially certified by the All India Football Federation to participate in the I-League 2nd Division, the second tier of football in India, after finishing 2nd in the Sikkim Premier Division League. This move began a new chapter for Gangtok-based side as they became one of first professional football clubs from the North East India.

2016 was the most successful season for Gangtok Himalayan, in which they participated in the I-League 2nd Division, Durand Cup, Sikkim Gold Cup and Sikkim Premier Division League.

After finishing 2nd in the group A of the 2015–16 I-League 2nd Division, Gangtok Himalayan qualified for the 2015–16 I-League 2nd Division Final Round. There they finished as 5th and failed to qualify for the I-League.

In 2016 Durand Cup, the Himalayans finished 5th, behind Indian Navy in the group A with 6 points.

In 2019, they reached to the final of 39th edition of the Sikkim Governor's Gold Cup final defeating Royal FC Siliguri 3–1, but lost the title winning match to Mohammedan Sporting by 2–1 margin. In that year, Gangtok Himalayan lifted Independence Day Football Tournament trophy defeating Sikkim Aacraman FC via penalty shoot-out.

I-League fate
The All India Football Federation were all set to invite bids for vacant spots in the I-League and Gangtok-based Sikkim Himalayan football club (now Gangtok Himalayan) were one of the front-runners to join, but it was not materialized.

2020–present
In 2020, Gangtok Himalayan went to Nepal for participating in the 18th Aaha! Rara Gold Cup, but their journey ended after a 3–0 defeat to Three Star Club in quarter-finals.

Rivalry
Gangtok Himalayan has a rivalry with their fellow Sikkim based club United Sikkim FC, whom they face in regional tournaments including Sikkim Premier Division League. The rivalry is commonly referred to as "Sikkim Derby". Both the clubs mostly use Paljor Stadium as their home ground. One of their most memorable matches was on 9 November 2019 during Sikkim Governor's Gold Cup, and Gangtok Himalayan won by 3–1.

Stadium

For I-League 2nd Division, the club announced that they would play their home matches at the 30,000 seater Paljor Stadium in the capital of Sikkim, Gangtok. The club has also used the stadium for matches of regional tournaments like Sikkim Premier Division League. It was opened in 1943 and has artificial turf.

Kit manufacturers and shirt sponsors

Past internationals
The players below had senior or age-level international cap(s) for their respective countries or autonomous regions. Players whose name is listed, represented their countries before or after playing for Gangtok Himalayan SC.
  Palsang Lama (2013–2015)
  Tashi Samphel (2016–2018)
  Tashi Tsering (2009–2010)
  Tsering Dhundup (2007–2008)
  Pema Lhundup (2018–2019)
  Yogesh Gurung (2013–2014)
  Karma Tsewang (2015–2017)
  Stephen Harry (2017–2018)

Honours

League
 Sikkim Premier Division League
Champions (1): 2014
Runners-up (1): 2016

Cup
 Sikkim Governor's Gold Cup
Runners-up (1): 2019
Independence Day Football Tournament
Champions (1): 2019
Kohima Royal Gold Cup
Champions (1): 1996
Darjeeling Gurkha Gold Cup
Runners-up (1): 2012
DSK Cup (Pune)
Runners-up (1): 2015
Oodlabari Football Tournament
Runners-up (1): 2019

See also
 List of football clubs in India

Notes

References

External links

Team info at Global Sports Archive
I-League 2nd Division pages: Gangtok FC at ArunFoot
Gangtok Himalayan SC at Aiscore
Gangtok Himalayan SC at Sofascore
team profile at Football Critic

Association football clubs established in 2012
Football clubs in Sikkim
I-League 2nd Division clubs
2012 establishments in Sikkim